Wayne Faucher is an American comic book inker. He is known mostly for his ink work on the Batman family of comics for DC Comics and for Spider-Man titles for Marvel Comics.

Career
Raised in Rhode Island and a graduate of the Rhode Island School of Design, he worked for years as a graphic designer in New York City and Boston before setting his sights on working in comics. He started in the industry in 1995, with the DC Comics series Impulse. Since then, Faucher has worked on dozens of titles for a variety of publishers.

Pencillers with whom he's frequently paired include: Humberto Ramos, Alex Maleev, Mark Buckingham, Dick Giordano, Mike Deodato, Chad Hardin, Alberto Ponticelli and others.

Selected works

DC Comics
 Arqueiro Verde e Canário Negro (2007)
 Impulse
 Batman: Shadow of the Bat
 Catwoman
 Detective Comics
 Wonder Woman
 Countdown
 Trinity
 Titans
 Legion
 Mr. Terrific
 Frankenstein Agent of S.H.A.D.E.
 Red Hood and the Outlaws

Marvel Comics
 Peter Parker: Spider-Man
 Nightcrawler
 The Spectacular Spider-Man

References

Living people
Year of birth missing (living people)
American comics artists